The Voice, The Guitar, The Songs Tour was a co-headlining concert tour by Latin rock band Santana and Rod Stewart. The tour began on May 23, 2014, and ended on August 20, 2014, with a time-out for most of the month of June, during which Stewart headlined the Rod Stewart Live tour which played five United Kingdom venues, and for all but the last day of July. The tour had $6,100,000 in sales.

Tour dates

Cancellations and rescheduled shows

References

Rod Stewart concert tours
2014 concert tours